George Alexander Jones (born 21 April 1945 in Radcliffe, Lancashire, England), is an English footballer who played as a forward in the Football League.

References

External links
George Jones's Career

1945 births
Living people
English footballers
People from Radcliffe, Greater Manchester
Association football forwards
Bury F.C. players
Blackburn Rovers F.C. players
Oldham Athletic A.F.C. players
Halifax Town A.F.C. players
Southport F.C. players
Lancaster City F.C. players
Radcliffe F.C. players
English Football League players